Keith Hunter Jesperson (born April 6, 1955) is a Canadian-American serial killer who murdered at least eight women in the United States during the early 1990s. He was known as the "Happy Face Killer" because he drew smiley faces on his many letters to the media and authorities. Many of his victims were sex workers and transients who had no connection to him. Strangulation was Jesperson's preferred method of murdering, the same method he often used to kill animals as a child.

After the body of his first victim, Taunja Bennett, was found, media attention surrounded Laverne Pavlinac, a woman who falsely confessed to having killed Bennett with the help of her abusive boyfriend, John Sosnovske. Upset that he was not getting any media attention, Jesperson drew a smiley face on a bathroom wall hundreds of miles from the scene of the crime and wrote an anonymous letter confessing to Bennett's murder, providing proof. When that did not elicit a response, he began writing letters to the media and authorities.

Jesperson's last victim was the crime that ultimately led to his capture. While he has claimed to have killed as many as 160 people, only eight murders have been confirmed. Jesperson is currently serving a sentence of life without parole at the Oregon State Penitentiary.

Early life
Jesperson was born on 6 April 1955, to Leslie (Les) and Gladys Jesperson in Chilliwack, British Columbia, Canada, the middle child with two brothers and two sisters. Jesperson's father was a domineering alcoholic; according to Jesperson, his paternal grandfather was prone to violence. Jesperson's father denied being an abusive parent; however, while investigating for his book on the killer, author Jack Olsen was able to confirm much of the claimed abuse with other family members.

Treated like an outcast and a black sheep by his own family and teased by other children for his large size at a young age, Jesperson was a lonely child who showed a propensity for torturing and killing animals. After moving to Selah, Washington, United States, he had trouble fitting in and making friends because of his large size. His brothers did not help him, instead they nicknamed him "Igor" or "Ig", a name that stuck throughout his school years. Because of this, Jesperson was a shy child, content to play by himself much of the time. He would often get into trouble for behaving badly, sometimes violently, and would be severely punished by his father. This included beatings, sometimes with a belt in front of others, and in one case he received an electric shock.

At a very early age—as young as five—Jesperson would capture and torture animals. He enjoyed watching animals kill each other as well as the feeling he got from taking their lives. This continued as he got older. Jesperson would capture birds and stray cats and dogs around the trailer park where he lived with his family, severely beating the animals and then strangling them to death, something for which he claims his father was proud of him. In the years following, Jesperson said he often thought about what it would be like to do the same to a human.

That desire manifested in two attempted murders. The first happened when Jesperson was around age 10, when he was friends with a boy named Martin. The two would often get into trouble together, and Jesperson claimed he was often punished many times for things Martin had done and shifted the blame. This led Jesperson to violently attack Martin until his father pulled him away. He later claimed his intention was to kill the boy. Approximately one year later, Jesperson was swimming in a lake when another boy held him underwater until he blacked out. Some time later, at a public pool, Jesperson attempted to drown the boy by holding his head under the water until a lifeguard pulled him away.

Jesperson reported that he was raped at age 14. He graduated from high school in 1973, but did not attend college because his father did not believe he could do it. Although Jesperson was not successful with girls in high school, having never even attended a school dance or his prom, he did enter into a relationship after high school. In 1975, when Jesperson was aged 20, he married Rose Hucke, and the couple had three children: two daughters and one son. Jesperson worked as a truck driver to support the family.

Several years later, Hucke began to suspect Jesperson was having affairs when strange women would call. Tension in the marriage increased, and after fourteen years, while Jesperson was on the road, Hucke packed up her and her children's belongings and drove 200 miles away to live with her parents in Spokane, Washington. The oldest child, Melissa, was ten years old. Jesperson continued to spend time with his children when he was in town. The couple divorced in 1990.

He then sought work again as an interstate truck driver after relocating to Cheney, Washington. Jesperson soon realized that this job afforded him the opportunity to kill without being suspected.

Victims

Jesperson's first known victim was Taunja Bennett on 21 January 1990, near Portland, Oregon, United States. He introduced himself to Bennett at a bar and invited her to a house he was renting. After getting in an argument with Bennett, he strangled her to death with his hands and disposed of her body.
 
On 30 August 1992, the currently unidentified body of a woman Jesperson had raped and strangled was found near Blythe, California, United States. Jesperson gives the Jane Doe's name as Claudia. A month later, in Turlock, California, the body of Cynthia Lyn Rose was discovered. Jesperson claims Rose was a sex worker who entered his truck at a truck stop while he slept. His fourth victim was another sex worker, Laurie Ann Pentland of Salem, Oregon, whose body was found in November 1992. According to Jesperson, Pentland attempted to double the fee she charged for the sex he had been engaged in with her. She threatened to call the police, and he strangled her.

Jesperson killed his next victim in June 1993 in Santa Nella, California. She was a previously-unidentified woman named Patricia Skiple, who, he claimed, was named "Carla" or "Cindy". Police originally considered her death a drug overdose. In September 1994, another Jane Doe was found in Crestview, Florida. Jesperson claims that her name was Susanne.

Jesperson was arrested on 30 March 1995 for the murder of Julie Winningham. He had been questioned by police a week before, but they had no grounds to arrest him after he refused to talk. In the days following, Jesperson decided that he was certainly going to be arrested, and after two suicide attempts turned himself in hoping it would result in leniency during his sentencing. While in custody, Jesperson began revealing details of his killings and making claims of many others, most of which he later recanted. A few days before his arrest, he wrote a letter to his brother in which he confessed to having killed eight people over the course of five years. This led police agencies in several states to reopen old cases, many of which were found to be possible victims of Jesperson.

Although Jesperson at one point claimed to have had as many as 160 victims, only the eight women killed in Washington, Oregon, California, Florida, Nebraska, and Wyoming have been confirmed. He is serving three consecutive life sentences at the Oregon State Penitentiary in Salem. In September 2009, Jesperson was indicted in Riverside County, California, on murder charges; he was extradited in December 2009. He was convicted of another murder and received a fourth life sentence in January 2010.

Laverne Pavlinac
Early in the investigation of Bennett's murder, Laverne Pavlinac read the news reports surrounding Bennett's death and saw it as an opportunity to force an end to the long-term abusive relationship she had been in with her live-in boyfriend, John Sosnovske. Pavlinac set up a meeting with investigators and gave a false confession, using the details she had read in the newspaper to give a detailed story of how Sosnovske forced her to help him rape, murder, and dispose of Bennett's body. Pavlinac and Sosnovske were both arrested on 5 March 1990 and both were convicted of the murder on 8 February 1991. To avoid the possibility of facing the death penalty, Sosnovske pleaded no contest. He was sentenced to life in prison while Pavlinac was sentenced to no less than ten years, much more than she had anticipated. Pavlinac soon admitted to making up her entire story, but her claims were ignored.

On 7 January 1996, more than five years after their conviction, Pavlinac and Sosnovske were released from prison after Jesperson and his attorney offered his confession with convincing evidence of his guilt. He had given police officers the location of the victim's purse. The purse had not been found at the crime scene, and its location was considered information only the killer would know.

"The Happy Face Killer"
Following Bennett's murder, as all the attention was going to Pavlinac and Sosnovske, Jesperson wrote a confession on the bathroom wall of a truck stop and signed it with a smiley face. When that did not create the attention he desired, he wrote letters to media outlets and police departments confessing to his murders, starting with a six-page letter to The Oregonian in which he revealed the details of his killings. Jesperson signed each letter with a smiley face. This led Phil Stanford, the journalist working the story for The Oregonian, to dub Jesperson "The Happy Face Killer".

Jesperson's daughter
In November 2008, Jesperson's daughter, Melissa G. Moore, appeared on Dr. Phil to talk about her father. She was also featured on The Oprah Winfrey Show, the Lifetime Movies network series Monster in My Family, and a 20/20 special on ABC. She was a correspondent for Crime Watch Daily.

In 2008, Moore published a book titled Shattered Silence: The Untold Story of a Serial Killer's Daughter. Moore recounts living with Jesperson until her parents' 1990 divorce, and noticing how her father was different when she was in elementary school. Their house bordered an apple orchard, and Jesperson killed stray cats and gophers that wandered nearby. One day, she watched, horrified, as he hung stray kittens from the family's clothesline. She ran to get her mother, and when they returned, the kittens lay on the ground dead. He had watched and laughed as the kittens clawed each other to escape, then he killed them. In November 2014, she wrote an article about her father for the BBC.

In March 2018, she was featured in an episode, titled "Put on a Happy Face", of the Investigation Discovery true crime series Evil Lives Here. In September 2018, podcast network HowStuffWorks began releasing a show called Happy Face featuring interviews with Melissa about her childhood and her father. The series had 12 episodes.

In June 2021, a trailer appeared on iTunes for a new true crime podcast called Life After Happy Face, to be hosted by Melissa Moore and forensic criminologist Laura Pettler.  The episode was released on July 9, 2021

See also 
List of serial killers in the United States
List of serial killers by number of victims

References

Further reading 
Moore, Melissa G. & M. Bridget Cook (2009). Shattered Silence: The Untold Story of the Daughter of a Serial Killer. Cedar Fort. .
Olsen, Jack (2002). I: the creation of a serial killer. St. Martin's Press. .

External links 
"Daughter of the 'Happy Face Killer' Talks About Growing Up With a Serial Killer Dad". ABC News 20/20. Retrieved 21 August 2010.
King, Gary C. "Keith Hunter Jesperson". truTV Crime Library. Retrieved on 21 August 2010.
Kreuger, Peggy; Kendra Justice & Amy Hunt (March 2006). "Keith Hunter Jesperson: Happy Face Killer" (PDF). Radford University Department of Psychology. Retrieved 21 August 2010.
 Daughter of serial killer confronts her past, Seattle Times
 My life as a serial killer’s daughter, BBC News
 Radio Interview with Melissa Moore (daughter)
 Stuff They Don't Want You To Know

1955 births
1990 murders in the United States
1992 murders in the United States
1994 murders in the United States
1995 murders in the United States
20th-century American criminals
20th-century Canadian criminals
American male criminals
American people convicted of murder
American prisoners sentenced to life imprisonment
American rapists
American serial killers
American truck drivers
Canadian male criminals
Canadian people convicted of murder
Canadian people imprisoned abroad
Canadian prisoners sentenced to life imprisonment
Canadian rapists
Canadian serial killers
Canadian truck drivers
Crime in California
Crime in Oregon
Crime in Washington (state)
Crimes against sex workers in the United States
Criminals from California
Criminals from Oregon
Criminals from Washington (state)
Fugitives
Living people
Male serial killers
Murder in California
Murder in Oregon
Murder in Washington (state)
People convicted of murder by Oregon
People extradited within the United States
People from Chilliwack
Prisoners sentenced to life imprisonment by Oregon
Violence against women in Canada
Violence against women in the United States